Jack Lee may refer to:

Sportspeople
Jack Lee (cricketer) (1902–1944), English cricketer
Jack Lee (footballer, born 1920) (1920–1995), English footballer and cricketer
Jack Lee (footballer, born 1998), English footballer
Jack Lee (rugby league) (born 1988), English rugby league player
Jack E. Lee (1936–2009), track announcer
Jacky Lee (1938–2016), American football player
Jack Lee (Australian footballer) (1878–1947), Australian rules footballer
Jack Lee (American football) (1917–1972), American football blocking back

Others
Jack Lee (chef) (born 1970), Vietnamese-American celebrity chef
Jack Lee (piper) (born 1957), Canadian bagpiper
Jack Lee (film director) (1913–2002), film director, writer, editor and producer
Jack Lee (judge) (1922–2006), Australian judge
Jack Lee (musician) (born 1952), American musician
Jack Lee (politician) (1920–2014), American politician
Jack Lee, the WW2 nom de plume of French SAS officer Raymond Couraud
T. Jack Lee (born 1935), Director of the NASA Marshall Space Flight Center

See also
John Lee (disambiguation)